Tarantula Hill, also known as Dawn’s Peak, is a  peak in Thousand Oaks, California. It is located on a  open space and is operated by the Conejo Open Space Conservation Agency (COSCA). Climbing Tarantula Hill is a steep  trail; the trailhead is located at 287 West Gainsborough Road, across the road from the main entrance to Conejo Valley Botanic Garden. Atop the mountain there is a 360-degree panoramic view of the Conejo Valley, the Simi Hills and the Santa Monica Mountains. There is also a fenced-in water reservoir located on top. It was once a popular hang-gliding site. It was once a volcanic mound but went dormant 16 million years ago. 

The hill is located near the center of the Conejo Valley.

Sources 

Mountains of Ventura County, California
Geography of Thousand Oaks, California
Parks in Ventura County, California
Mountains of Southern California